Paul Czinner (30 May 1890 – 22 June 1972) was a Hungarian-born British writer, film director, and producer.

Biography
Czinner was born to a Jewish family in Budapest, Austria-Hungary.

After studying literature and philosophy at the University of Vienna, he worked as a journalist. From 1919 onward, he dedicated himself to work for the film industry as writer, director and producer. Czinner became engaged to actress Gilda Langer in early 1920. Shortly after their engagement Langer succumbed to the Spanish flu and died on 31 January 1920.

In 1924, he offered the leading role in his film Nju to Elisabeth Bergner. They became partners. Due to the persecution of Jews by the Nazi Party under Adolf Hitler, the two, both Jewish, fled to Vienna and then London, where they were married. Despite Czinner's homosexuality, the union proved a happy and personally and professionally enriching one for both partners. 1934 saw the realisation of his film Catherine the Great, with his wife playing the main role, though the film was not shown in Germany.

They emigrated to the United States in 1940, working on Broadway. After the end of World War II, they returned to England, where Czinner successfully adapted numerous operas to film (e.g. Don Giovanni, Der Rosenkavalier).

Death
Czinner died on 22 June 1972 in London, aged 82.

Selected filmography
 Inferno (1919)
 Husbands or Lovers (1924)
 Jealousy (1925)
 The Fiddler of Florence (1926)
 Doña Juana (1927)
 Fräulein Else (1929)
 The Way of Lost Souls (released in USA as The Woman He Scorned) (1929)
 Ariane (1931)
 Dreaming Lips (1932)
 Ariane, Russian maid (1932)
  (1932)
 Catherine the Great (1934)
 Escape Me Never (1935)
 As You Like It (1936)
 Dreaming Lips (1937)
 Stolen Life (1939)
 Don Giovanni, based on Mozart's opera. (1954)
 The Bolshoi Ballet (1958)
 The Royal Ballet (1959)
 Der Rosenkavalier, based on the opera by Richard Strauss (1962)
 Romeo and Juliet, ballet film starring Rudolf Nureyev and Margot Fonteyn (1966)

References

External links
 
 

1890 births
1972 deaths
Austro-Hungarian people
American people of Hungarian-Jewish descent
University of Vienna alumni
Hungarian expatriates in the United Kingdom
Hungarian film directors
American film directors
American film producers
German-language film directors
Hungarian Jews
Hungarian film producers
Hungarian emigrants to the United States
Hungarian expatriates in Germany
Hungarian expatriates in Austria